Hello Yaar Pesurathu is a 1985 Indian Tamil-language film directed by actor Ramarajan, starring Suresh and Jeevitha. It was released on 22 August 1985.

Plot

Cast 
Suresh
Jeevitha

Soundtrack 
The music was composed by Ilaiyaraaja and Gangai Amaran.

References

External links 
 

1980s Tamil-language films
1985 films
Films scored by Gangai Amaran
Films scored by Ilaiyaraaja
Films directed by Ramarajan